Shah Abdul Latif Bhittai (1689/1690 – 21 December 1752), commonly known by the honorifics Lakhino Latif, Latif Ghot, Bhittai, and Bhit Jo Shah, was a Sindhi Sufi mystic, and poet, widely considered to be the greatest poet of the Sindhi language.

Born to a Sayyid family (descendants of the Islamic prophet Muhammad through his daughter Fatima) of Hala Haweli near modern-day Hala, Latif grew up in the nearby town of Kotri Mughal. At the age of around 20, he left home and traveled throughout Sindh and neighboring lands, and met many a mystic and Jogis, whose influence is evident in his poetry. Returning home after three years, he was married into an aristocrat family, but was widowed shortly afterwards and did not remarry. His piety and spirituality attracted large following as well as hostility of a few. Spending last years of his life at Bhit Shah, he died in 1752. A mausoleum was built over his grave in subsequent years and became a popular pilgrimage site.

His poems were compiled by his disciples in his Shah Jo Risalo. It was first published in 1866. Several Urdu and English translations of the work have been published since. Latif's poetry is popular among the people of Sindh and he is venerated throughout the province.

Life
Tuhfat al-Kiram and Maqalat al-shu'ara, written by Mir Ali Sher Qani Tahttwi, a contemporary of Shah Abdul Latif, some fifteen years after the death of  the poet, give some basic details of his life. Other than these, however, little written records exist from the early period and most of the material was transmitted orally through generations. The oral traditions were collected and documented in the late 19th century by Mirza Qalich Beg and Mir Abd al-Husayn Sangi. Together with Thattwi's works, these form the basis for the outline of the poet's life.

Latif was born in 1689 or 1690 in Hala Haweli near modern-day Hala, to Shah Habib, a great-grandson of the Sufi poet Shah Abdul Karim Bulri. His ancestors traced their lineage back to the fourth caliph Ali and Fatima, the daughter of the Islamic prophet Muhammad. They had emigrated to Sindh from Herat during the late 14th century. Latif spent early years of his childhood in Hala Haweli, but the family then relocated to the nearby town of Kotri Mughal. Local tradition holds that he was illiterate, however his use of Arabic and Persian in his poetry and the influence of the Persian poet Rumi evident on his thought show that he was well educated. At the age of around 20, he fell in love with Saida Begum, a daughter of an Arghun aristocrat of Kotri Mughal, Mirza Mughal Beg, which landed Latif's family in trouble and caused them return to Hala Haweli. Her love, however, had a deep impact on young Latif and he left home wandering deserts and embarking on travel through Sindh and adjacent lands. According to Motilal Jotwani, it was perhaps during these travels that his poetic nature came to the fore. He mentions the places he visited in his poems. First he went to Ganjo Hill near what is now Hyderabad, thereafter traveling to Kalachi (modern Karachi) through Thatta and Banbhore. On the journey he met Jogis and accompanied them to Hinglaj in mountains of southern Balochistan. On his return east, he visited Lahut in Lasbela, and then travelled across to Dwarka, Porbandar, Junagadh, and several other places in  Kutch region. Returning west, he visited Karoonjhar Mountains in Nagarparkar. Parting ways with the Jogis in Thar, he went to Jaisalmer before returning to Thatta and then home. His travels seem to have had a strong influence on his poetry.

Latif returned home after three years. In 1713 Mirza Mughal Beg was killed while in pursuit of robbers who had looted his house. After this incident, Latif was married to Saida Begum, the woman whom he had been in love with. The marriage did not result in any offspring and Saida Begum died a few years into the marriage. Latif did not remarry and remained childless his entire life. He now seems to have settled down and devoted to prayer and worship. His piety attracted a large following, which reportedly earned him hostility of nobles and Noor Mohammad Kalhoro, the ruler of Sindh, who is said to have unsuccessfully tried assassinating him by poisoning.

Some ten years before his death, Latif left his home, relocating to a sandhill a few miles from Hala Haweli, which later became known as Bhit Shah (Mound of Shah), hence his title Bhittai (the dweller of Bhit). Latif died at Bhit on 21 December 1752 (14 Safar 1166 AH) at the age of 63 and was buried there. A tomb was built over his grave by the then ruler of Sindh Mian Ghulam Shah Kalhoro in 1754, or 1765.

Poetry

Latif's poetry is mainly Sufi in nature and deeply religious. He connects the traditional folk tales with the divine love. The poems, known locally as bayt (pl. abyat) and similar in form to the Indian doha, are lyrical and are intended for a musical performance, and are usually very compact.

In addition, he has also used a bit more relaxed format called wa'i.

Latif is said to have always kept with himself the Qur'an, Karim jo Risalo, and the Mathnawi of Rumi. He seems to have been significantly influenced by the latter; sometimes he reflects his ideas and sometimes translates his verses in his poems.

Rumi has expressed similar idea in his verses:

During Latif's lifetime, Sindh transitioned from Delhi-based Mughal rule to the local Kalhora dynasty. During the later part of Latif's life, Nadir Shah Afshar sacked Delhi and made Sindh his tributary. Latif also witnessed Ahmad Shah Durrani's attack on Delhi and his subjection of Sindh to Afghan rule. Despite all this, his poetry is devoid of any mention of these upheavals or the political landscape of his time in general. H. T. Sorley has attributed this to his interest in "eternal verities" and indifference to "transient phenomena" and "petty wars".

Risalo
Latif's poetry was not written down during his lifetime, but was sung and memorized by his disciples during the musical sessions (Rag) that he used to hold. The poems were compiled after his death into a collection called Shah Jo Risalo (the Book of Shah). The Risalo was first published in 1866 by the German philologist Ernest Trumpp. It contains thirty chapters, called Sur, each focusing on a particular musical mode. Each Sur is further divided into sections, dastan (story) or fasl (chapter), which contain similarly themed abyat. Each section ends with one or more wa'is. Some Surs focus on folk tales of the Indian sub-continent such as Sassui Punhun, Sohni Mehar, Umar Marui, and Lilan Chanesar, whereas others, like Sur Asa and Sur Yaman Kalyan, describe the mystical moods and ideal traditional lover. Sur Sarang is devoted to the praise of the Islamic prophet Muhammad, while Sur Kedaro laments the death of Muhammad's grandson, and Latif's ancestor, Husayn ibn Ali at the Battle of Karbala in 680 . Sur Kedaro has been said by some prominent scholars of Shah's poetry such as Nabi Bakhsh Baloch and Ghulam Muhammad Shahwani to have come from a external source rather than Shah himself.

Since the first edition of the Risalo, several other editions have been published by various scholars including Mirza Qalich Beg, Hotchand Molchand Gurbakhshani, Ghulam Muhammad Shahvani, Kalyan Advani, and Nabi Bakhsh Baloch. Urdu translations have been published by Shaikh Ayaz, and Ayaz Husayn Qadiri and Sayyid Vaqar Ahmad Rizvi. The first partial English translation of the Risalo was published by H. T. Sorley in 1940, followed by Elsa Kazi, and Ghulam Ali Allana. Complete translations have been published by Muhammad Yakoob Agha, Amena Khamisani, and others. Early manuscripts of the Risalo as well as published editions show considerable differences in the content. The most widely accepted version has some 3,000 abyat and 200 wa'is.

Legacy
Latif is regarded as the greatest Sufi poet of the Sindhi language, and the national poet of Sindh. According to the orientalist Annemarie Schimmel, he is "The most outstanding master of popular Sufi poetry in Pakistan." According to Seyyed Hossein Nasr, Latif's Risalo has been compared with Rumi's Mathnawi, and Latif was "direct emanations of Rūmī's spirituality in the Indian world." Every Thursday evening, Latif's poetry is sung by traditional musicians and dervishes at the shrine in a typical ecstatic style. The performance is commonly referred to as Shah jo Rag (Shah's music).

Popular culture
Latif's poetry is popular among the Sindhi people, including both Muslims and Hindus. Latif's own connections with Jogis and Sanyasis may have contributed to this. The folk tales narrated in the Surs of the Risalo are frequently recounted and sung to children. Many anecdotes of haigographical nature are famous among the locals. One such story holds that when he was being taught the alphabet, he refused to learn anything beyond the letter Alif for it signifies the name of God (Allah) and there is nothing of value beyond it. Another story of this kind asserts that his followers presented him a written copy of the Risalo, which he threw away in the nearby Kirar lake after having read it. When the followers protested, he allowed them to rewrite the entire Risalo by narrating it from his memory. His tomb is a popular pilgrimage site in Sindh.

Urs
The Urs, an annual commemoration of his death, occurs on 14 Safar, the second month of the Hijra calendar. The ceremony, which lasts for three days, features prayers, music, exhibitions, literary conferences, and horse races. People visit the shrine from all over the province. A 16-foot-high statue of Latif was erected in front of the Bhit Shah rest house on the occasion of his 274th Urs in 2017.

See also
Khawaja Muhammad Zaman of Luari
Sachal Sarmast

Notes

References

Bibliography
 
 
 
 
 
 
  
 
 
 
 
 
 
 
 Ghulam Hussain (2021) The politics of metaphor: traces of casteism and patriarchy in the work of Shah Abdul Latif, Postcolonial Studies, DOI: 10.1080/13688790.2021.1923154

External links

Biographies

Biography of Shah Abdul Latif
Shah Bhitai — The soul of Sindh
Life and times of Shah Bhitai

Poetry
 Shah Latif's poetry: translated into English by Elsa Kazi
 Audio samples of Shah Bhitai's poetry set to music

 
1689 births
1752 deaths
Mystic poets
 People from Matiari District
Sufi poets
Sufi mystics
Sufism in Sindh
Sufism in India
Sindhi Sufi saints
Mughal Empire poets
Sindhi-language poets
Sindhi people
History of Sindh
Sindhi-language writers
Mughal Empire Sufis
Shrines in Pakistan